Hugo Pablo Centurión (born 2 September 1976 in Eldorado, Misiones, Argentina) is an Argentine former professional footballer naturalized Colombian who played as a forward or midfielder.

References
 
 

1974 births
Living people
Association football forwards
Association football midfielders
Argentine footballers
Argentine expatriate footballers
Argentina international footballers
Club Sol de América footballers
12 de Octubre Football Club players
Deportivo Recoleta footballers
Sportivo Luqueño players
Club Libertad footballers
Deportes Concepción (Chile) footballers
Deportivo Pasto footballers
América de Cali footballers
Club Atlético 3 de Febrero players
C.S.D. Macará footballers
Deportes Tolima footballers
Paraguayan Primera División players
Categoría Primera A players
Categoría Primera B players
Expatriate footballers in Chile
Expatriate footballers in Colombia
Expatriate footballers in Ecuador
Expatriate footballers in Paraguay
Argentine expatriate sportspeople in Chile
Argentine expatriate sportspeople in Colombia
Argentine expatriate sportspeople in Ecuador
Argentine expatriate sportspeople in Paraguay
Sportspeople from Misiones Province